are a brand of toys designed by Bandai.  According to the official Bandai webpage, the toy is no longer in production. They were developed by Prof. Tomio Watanabe of Okayama Prefectural University as part of studying cuteness.

Product Description
A Unazukin looks like a small "angel" averaging 5 cm (2 inches) high. They are reminiscent of a nesting Matryoshka doll, and have a retro/popart style decoration. Some models are voice activated and react to voice, nodding and shaking their head. Battery powered with an on/off switch, they have four different movements, shaking head back and forth once or twice; and nodding once or twice.

Series
 Sakura
 First Version - Clover, Shine, Bird, Flower, Dot, Stripe
 Gift Version - Happy Birthday, Anniversary, How Are You, Congratulations, Thank You
 Nature Version - Moon, Rainbow, Green, Sun, Star
 World Version - Hopi, Fei, Rani, Irene, Hana
 Flower Version - Rose, Dandelion, Violet, Cherry Blossoms, Poppy, Hydrangea
 Irodori Version - Kuchinashi, Sango, Tsuyukusa, Fuji, Moegi
 Fruit Version - Grape, Strawberry, Green Apple, Orange, Pear
 Birthstone Version - Garnet, Amethyst, Aquamarine, Diamond, Emerald, Pearl, Ruby, Peridot, Sapphire, Opal, Topaz, Lapis Lazuli
 Anniversary Version - Tuxedo, Gown
 Dressy Version - Wedding Couple, King & Queen

References

External links
Official Bandai Page
Youtube video featuring Unazukin

Bandai